Lilium washingtonianum is a North American plant species in the lily family. It is also known as the Washington lily, Shasta lily, or Mt. Hood lily. It is named after Martha Washington and not the state of Washington; in fact, as the northern range of the plant is near Mount Hood in Oregon, it does not naturally occur in the state of Washington.

Lilium washingtonianum is native to the Cascade Range and Sierra Nevada of western North America. Its range is limited to the states of California and Oregon.

Description
Lilium washingtonianum grows up to 2 m tall, and bears large fragrant white or pinkish flowers that are often decorated with purplish spots. The tepals are 6 to 9 cm long and not strongly reflexed. It is typically found in chaparral, open woods, recently burned areas, or revegetating clearcuts.

Subspecies
 Lilium washingtonianum subsp. purpurascens (Stearn) M.W.Skinner - flowers aging deep pink or lavender
 Lilium washingtonianum subsp. washingtonianum - flowers aging pink or white

References

External links
Jepson Flora Project - Lilium washingtonianum
United States Department of Agriculture Plants Profile: Lilium washingtonianum
Lilium washingtonianum - Calfotos Photo gallery, University of California

washingtonianum
Flora of California
Flora of Oregon
Flora of the Cascade Range
Flora of the Sierra Nevada (United States)
Endemic flora of the United States
Taxa named by Albert Kellogg
Flora without expected TNC conservation status